Houston Irving Flournoy (October 7, 1929 – January 7, 2008) was an American politician who served as a California legislator and State Controller. He later became a professor of public administration at the University of Southern California (USC). As of 2023, he is the most recent Republican to have served as California State Controller.

Born in New York City, he attended Cornell University in Ithaca, New York, where he was active in the Cornell University Glee Club and the Lambda Chi Alpha fraternity. He studied under Clinton Rossiter, a Cornell faculty member who was an authority on The Federalist. After graduating from Cornell in 1950, he served in the United States Air Force during the Korean War. In 1956, he earned a Ph.D. in politics at Princeton University. While in New Jersey, he worked in politics as a researcher for the New Jersey Legislature and an aide to Senator H. Alexander Smith.

In 1957, he took a faculty position in the Pomona College Department of Political Science, where he quickly won tenure and remained a full time professor until 1960 and a part time faculty member until 1966, when he ran for California State Controller. In 1960, he successfully ran for California State Assembly as a Republican Party candidate, and served from 1961 to 1967. In 1966, he was elected California State Controller and served as Controller from 1967 to 1975.

In 1974 he ran for Governor of California. He defeated the more conservative choice, Lieutenant Governor Ed Reinecke, in the GOP primary but then lost a surprisingly close election to Democratic Secretary of State Jerry Brown in a heavily Democratic year. Flournoy, who blamed the September 1974 Gerald Ford pardon of Richard Nixon for his loss, never ran for political office again.

In 1976, he was appointed professor at USC in Los Angeles. He taught at the School of Public Administration (now part of the School of Policy, Planning, and Development) until 1993. He also served the USC administration as a governmental affairs advisor until 1999. He also served on the boards of several corporations. After retirement he resided in Ponte Vedra Beach, Florida, and Bodega Bay, California. Flournoy died of congestive heart failure on January 7, 2008, on a flight from San Diego to Santa Rosa, California.

External links
Houston Flournoy *56 - obituary at Princeton
Tribute by State Senator Tom McClintock

References

1929 births
2008 deaths
State Controllers of California
Republican Party members of the California State Assembly
American Congregationalists
Cornell University alumni
Princeton University alumni
University of Southern California faculty
Pomona College faculty
20th-century American politicians